The Haufe HA-G-1 Buggie is an American high-wing, strut-braced, single-seat, glider that was designed and constructed by Bruno Haufe and Klaus Hill, first flying in 1967.

Design and development
Haufe and Hill intended to design and build a glider in the style of the classic open-cockpit gliders of the 1930s, like the Hütter Hü 17. The resulting design was an all-metal aircraft, with a welded steel tube fuselage, covered in doped aircraft fabric covering. The  span wing has an 11.2:1 aspect ratio, employs a Clark Y airfoil and mounts spoilers. The landing gear is a fixed monowheel, supplemented by a fixed skid. The prototype was painted a bright yellow.

Only one Buggie was completed; the aircraft was registered with the US Federal Aviation Administration in the Experimental - Amateur-built category.

Haufe and Hill went on to design and built the Haufe HA-S-2 Hobby and the Haufe HA-S-3 Hobby, based on their experiences with the Buggie.

Operational history
In August 2011 the sole example built was still on the FAA registry, although its status was listed as "in question".

Specifications (Buggie)

See also

References

1960s United States sailplanes
Homebuilt aircraft
Aircraft first flown in 1967